Soak City is an outdoor water park in Shakopee, Minnesota, United States, within the Valleyfair amusement park, and owned by Cedar Fair. It is included with the price of admission to the park.

History
The Panic Falls slide complex, built in 1983, was the original part of the park. Originally the area of water rides was called 'Liquid Lightning', but as more were added, the name was changed to Whitewater Country Waterpark in 1992. In late 2008, the name was officially changed to Soak City, consistent with the theming of other water parks of Cedar Fair. On September 11, 2014, Valleyfair announced a major expansion for Soak City. The main headline was slide complex with Breaker's Plunge and Breaker's Pipeline. Also added were Barefoot Beach, a kid's splash pad and sand volleyball courts.

Slides and attractions
Soak City occupies  and features a wavepool, twelve waterslides, two raft rides, and a lazy river.

See also
 Other Soak City locations
 List of Cedar Fair water parks

References

External links
 Soak City Website

Cedar Fair water parks
Buildings and structures in Scott County, Minnesota
Water parks in Minnesota
Tourist attractions in Scott County, Minnesota
Valleyfair
1983 establishments in Minnesota